Beatrice Kean Seymour (1 September 1886 – 31 October 1955) was a prolific British novelist and short story writer. Her obituary in The Times described her as skilled at portraying English domestic life.

Biography 

Beatrice Kean Seymour (née Beatrice Mary Stapleton) was born in Clapham, south London into a working-class family. Her father David was a farrier.

She attended a secretarial school and was the first wife of William Kean Seymour.

She began her professional life as a writer of short stories for magazines. However, at the suggestion of an editor, she reworked one of her unpublished short stories into her first novel, Invisible Tides, subsequently writing over 30 books during a career that spanned more than three decades. Her novels were published almost annually until shortly before her death from heart problems in 1955.

Approach to writing 

Seymour believed that the role of the novelist is to help readers think through their emotions. She saw the novel as far superior to the short story as a vehicle for conveying social ideas.

Critical reception 

Some British reviewers reportedly considered Invisible Tides to be the best novel of 1920. A reviewer from The Bookman wrote that it was: "a good and moving story, brilliantly set down, having affinities, it seems to us, with  Jude the Obscure on the one hand and with Mr. McKenna's Sonia on the other. Mrs. Seymour is strong in characterisation, subtle and revealing in dialogue, and exquisite in her descriptions of nature, touched as they are with a fine imaginativeness".

Her 1925 novel Unveiled received a glowing review in the 30 May 1925 issue of The New Yorker. But some critical responses were not so favourable. A Times Literary Supplement critic wrote of her 1927 novel Three Wives: "Had Miss Seymour compressed her novel into three-quarters its present length, it might have been a really distinguished piece of work".

When she died in 1955, The Times said of her: “She had already established herself as a literary figure of importance 30 years ago and the skill and variety with which she portrayed English domestic scenes and projected them against a larger social and political background are of a high order”.

More recently, her novels have been appraised as reflecting an alertness to the role of women in society.

Published works 

 Invisible Tides, 1919
 Intrusion, 1921
 The Hopeful Journey, 1923
 The Romantic Tradition, 1925
 Unveiled, 1925
 The Last Day, 1926
 Journey's End (short story), 1927, in Georgian Stories, edited by Arthur Waugh
 Three Wives, 1927
 Youth Rides Out, 1928
 False Spring, 1929
 Introduction to The Pitiful Wife by Storm Jameson, 1931
 But Not for Love, 1931
 With Heartiest Christmas and New Year Greetings, 1932 (with William Kean Seymour)
 Maids and Mistresses, 1932
 Daughter to Philip, 1933
 Interlude for Sally, 1934
 Frost at Morning, 1935
 Summer of Life, 1936
 The Happier Eden, 1937
 Jane Austen; a Study for a Portrait (biography), 1937.
 Fool of Time, 1940
 The Chronicles of Sally, 1940
 The Unquiet Field, 1940
 Happy Ever After, 1941
 Return Journey, 1942
 Buds of May, 1943
 Joy as it Flies, 1944
 Tumbled House, 1946
 Family Group, 1947
 The Children Grow Up, 1949
 The Second Mrs. Cornford, 1951
 The Wine is Poured, 1953
 The Painted Lath'', 1955.

References

External sources 
 Beatrice Kean Seymour, The Online Books Page, University of Pennsylvania

British writers
1886 births
1955 deaths